Zuckerkandl is a 1968 animated film directed by John Hubley. Narrated by Robert Maynard Hutchins, a former president of the University of Chicago and dean of Yale Law School, it was made into a comic book of the same name.  The film profiles the fictitious philosopher Alexander Zuckerkandl and can be interpreted as a parody of Sigmund Freud.

See also
List of American films of 1968

References

External links
 
 Zuckerkandl! at the British Film Institute
 Discussion at Michael Sporn Animation

1968 films
1960s American animated films
American parody films
Films about philosophers
Films directed by John Hubley
1968 comedy films
Fictional Austrian people